The Bowler and the Bunnet was a Scottish television documentary programme on STV, directed and presented by Sean Connery. It is the only film ever directed by Connery.

The documentary, filmed in black and white, was a critical examination of the Fairfield Experiment, whereby the industrialist Sir Iain Maxwell Stewart and the trades union introduced new working practices at the shipyard of Fairfield Shipbuilding and Engineering Company in Glasgow. It was released onto DVD by the British Film Institute as part of their Tales from the Shipyard boxed-set in February 2011.

The title comes from the tradition where bowler hats were worn by managers within the shipyards while bonnets (cloth caps) were worn by the workers.

References

External links
 
 Tales from the Shipyard at the Digital Fix

1967 television films
1967 films
1967 in Scotland
Films shot in Glasgow
History of Glasgow
Television shows produced by Scottish Television
Documentary films about Scotland
Films about industries
Govan